Eevamari Rauhamäki (born 23 February 1982) is a Finnish biathlete. She competed in the 2014/15 world cup season, and represented Finland at the Biathlon World Championships 2015 in Kontiolahti.

References

External links 
 

1982 births
Living people
Finnish female biathletes